Samuel Ohlsson (born 13 May 2001) is a Swedish footballer who plays for Ljungskile as a defender.

Club career
After playing for Ljungskile on loan in the second half of the 2021 season, on 1 February 2022 Ohlsson returned to the club on a permanent basis on a one-year deal.

Personal life
He is the younger brother of FC St. Pauli player Sebastian Ohlsson.

References

External links 
 

2001 births
Living people
Swedish footballers
Association football defenders
Sweden youth international footballers
IFK Göteborg players
Örgryte IS players
Ljungskile SK players
Allsvenskan players
Superettan players
Ettan Fotboll players